This article lists diplomatic missions resident in North Macedonia.  At present, the capital city of Skopje hosts 32 embassies. Several other countries have missions accredited from other capitals.

Embassies in Skopje

Gallery

List of ambassadors 
 — Fatos Reka
 — Georg Woutsas
 — Dragan Jaćimović
 — Angel Angelov
 — Zhang Zuo
 — Nives Tiganj
 — Miroslav Toman
 — Cyrille Baumgartner
 — Anke Gisela Holstein
 — Roussos Koundouros
 — László István Dux
 — Andrea Silvestri 
 — Hironori Sawada
 — Prindon Sadriu (Chargé d’Affaires a.i) 
 — Marija Petrovic
 — Dirk Jan Kop
 — Wojciech Tyciński
 — Sheikh Jassim Hamad Al-Thani  (Chargé d’Affaires a.i)
 — Adela Monica Axinte
 — Sergey Bazdnikin
 — Nevena Jovanović
 — L’Emir Habib George Zoghbi 
 — Henrik Markuš
 — Milan Predan
 — Emilio Lorenzo Serra
 — Kristin Forsgren Bengtsson
 — Sybille Suter Tejada
 — Hasan Mehmet Sekizkök
 — Nataliia Zadorozhniuk
 — Rachel Galloway
 — Kate Marie Byrnes
 — David Geer
  —  Zoran Jankovič

Other missions in Skopje 
 (Delegation)
  (Delegation)

International organizations in the North Macedonia 
United Nations — Rossana Dudziak 
United Nations Development Programme — Narine Sahakyan 
United Nations High Commissioner for Refugees — Monica Sandri 
United Nations Office for Project Services — Michela Telatin 
United Nations Children’s Fund — Patrizia Di Giovanni 
International Organization for Migration — Peter Van Der Auweraert 
International Monetary Fund — Sebastian Sosa 
The World Bank Office — Massimiliano Paolucci 
World Health Organization — Jihane Tawilah 
Migration, Asylum, Refugees Regional Initiative Regional Centre — Sasko Kocev 
 Support Element- KFOR — Jean Marie-Rollinger     
German National Support Element — Birgit Fröhlich
Irish National Support Element — Conrad Johnston
Polish National Support Element —
Ukraine KFOR National Support Element — Kramarenko Ihor
Headquarters Multinational Peace Force South-Eastern Europe Brigade (SEEBRIG) — Aristidis Iliopoulos
 OSCE — Clemens Koja 
 Turkish Cooperation and Coordination Agency — Halim Ömer Söğüt 
European Regional Institute for Development Studies — Vlado Kambovski 
International Centre for Migration Policy Development — Melita Gruevska Graham 
European Bank for Reconstruction and Development —  Andi Aranitasi 
German Development Cooperation — René Eschemann 
International Management Group — Argjent Karai 
Goethe — Tanja Krüger 
SOS Children's Villages — Julijana Nakova Gapo 
Sos Kinderdorf International — Caroline Taylor 
Regional Environmental Center for Central and Eastern Europe — Milena Manova 
Regional Rural Development Standing Working Group — Boban Ilić

Embassies to open

Former embassy 
  (Closed in 2012)

Non-resident embassies accredited to North Macedonia 
Resident in Ankara, Turkey

Resident in Berlin, Germany

Resident in Bucharest, Romania

Resident in Budapest, Hungary

Resident in Belgrade, Serbia

Resident in Rome, Italy

Resident in Sofia, Bulgaria

Resident in other cities

See also 
 List of diplomatic missions of North Macedonia
 List of diplomatic visits to North Macedonia
 Foreign relations of North Macedonia

Footnotes

Branch office in Skopje.

Notes

References
Skopje diplomatic list

 
North Macedonia
Diplomatic missions